"In the Night" is a song by Canadian singer the Weeknd from his second studio album Beauty Behind the Madness (2015). The Weeknd wrote the song with Belly, Savan Kotecha, Peter Svensson, and producers Max Martin & Ali Payami, with the Weeknd serving as co-producer. The song was released to contemporary hit radio as the album's fourth single on November 17, 2015.

Composition
The song is written in the key of A minor in compound meter with a moderate tempo of 112 beats per minute. The Weeknd's vocals span from E3 to D5 in the song.

Critical reception
The song was well received by critics. Like the Weeknd's previous collaboration with Max Martin, "Can't Feel My Face", it has been widely compared to works by Michael Jackson. Jon Dolan of Rolling Stone wrote "Sometimes, the album stirs up real drama. 'In the Night' could be just one more 'Dirty Diana'-style ode to a predatory babe — until we learn the woman in the song is the victim of abuse, 'dancing to relieve the pain.'" Harley Brown of Spin wrote that the song "comes the closest to the wall-scaling studio and automobile airwave euphoria of 'Can't Feel My Face', ratcheting up to background synths on the scope of '80s spectacles like 'Everybody Wants to Rule the World.'" He adds, "The real star here is, as usual, his voice, tapping at the uppermost fragile glass of his register without quite breaking it".

Music video
The song's music video, directed by BRTHR, was released on December 8, 2015, and features the Weeknd's then-girlfriend, model Bella Hadid. It depicts Hadid as a waitress at a seedy nightclub of dancers frequented by dangerous gangsters. The leading gangster takes a particular liking to the waitress, as the Weeknd watches helplessly as she and the dancers are being taken advantage of by gangsters. The clip grows increasingly disorienting, building to a chaotic sequence in which the waitress and her fellow dancers finally kill off the gangsters. The leading gangster, however, tracks down the Weeknd in the final scene, placing a gun to his head — but is saved by who appears to be the waitress, who kills the gangster, before the two ride off on a motorcycle. The video ends with the dancers dragging a gangster's corpse into a sea, with shaky camera footage, as the screen goes to black. A shortened version of the video was released on February 14, 2016.

Charts

Weekly charts

Year-end charts

Certifications

Release history

References

2015 songs
2015 singles
The Weeknd songs
Songs written by Belly (rapper)
Songs written by Max Martin
Songs written by Savan Kotecha
Songs written by the Weeknd
Songs written by Ali Payami
Songs written by Peter Svensson
Song recordings produced by Max Martin
Song recordings produced by the Weeknd
Republic Records singles
XO (record label) singles